Smečice is a small settlement in the hills west of Krško in eastern Slovenia. The area is part of the traditional region of Lower Carniola. It is now included with the rest of the municipality in the Lower Sava Statistical Region.

There is a small chapel-shrine in the settlement. It is dedicated to the Holy Family and was built in the late  19th  century.

References

External links
Smečice on Geopedia

Populated places in the Municipality of Krško